BM Atlético Valladolid is a team of handball based in Valladolid, Spain. It plays in Liga ASOBAL.

History

Atlético Valladolid was founded on June 4, 2014. On June 30, 2014, there was a vacancy in the second division after Pozoblanco Handball Club withdrew. Atlético Valladolid could start in their place in the second division. In the first season of its history (2014-2015), the Valladolid club was coached by Nacho González, but it lost to the Balonmano Sinfín team in the finals of the playoffs, so it did not reach the Liga ASOBAL. Sponsored by Recoletas, Atlético Valladolid ended its second season (2015-2016) by winning the league title and promotion to Liga ASOBAL. A historic success that allowed a team born at only two years of age to compete in the highest category of national handball for the first time. The club has been playing in Liga ASOBAL ever since.

Crest, colours, supporters

Kit manufacturers

Kits

Sports Hall information

Name: – Polideportivo Huerta del Rey
City: – Valladolid
Capacity: – 3502
Address: – C. de Joaquín Velasco Martín, 9, 47014, Valladolid, Spain

Team

Current squad 

Squad for the 2022–23 season

Technical staff
 Head coach:  David Pisonero
 Assistant coach:  Óscar Ollero
 Fitness coach:  Pablo Arranz
 Physiotherapist:  Javier González
 Club Doctor:  Pablo Grande

Transfers

Transfers for the 2022–23 season

Joining 
  Dimitar Dimitrioski (LW) from  RK Eurofarm Pelister 2
  José Toledo (RB) from  CS Minaur Baia Mare
  Pedro Martínez (LP) from  BM Benidorm
  Henrique Petter (LB) from  SD Atlético Novás
  Daniel Virulegio (LP) from  BM Cisne
  Nicolo D'Antino (RW) on loan from  CB Nava

Leaving 
  Guillermo Fischer (LB) to  Balonmano Base Oviedo
  Mauricio Basualdo (RB) to  JS Cherbourg
  Jorge Serrano (RW) to  TVB 1898 Stuttgart
  Daniel Ramos Crespo (LP) to  BM Torrelavega
  Daniel Pérez Bravo (LW) to  CB Nava
  Sergio Casares (RW) to  CB Nava
  Diego Pérez Méndez (LW) to  BM Ciudad de Málaga
  Álvaro Pérez (GK) to  BM Ciudad de Málaga
  Diego Camino (CB) (retires)
  Arthur Patrianova (LB) (retires)
  Paolo Roki (LB)

Previous Squads

Former club members

Notable former players

  David Fernández Alonso (2015–2016)
  Fernando Hernández (2014–2019)
  José Delgado (2014-2016)
  Daniel Dujshebaev (2016–2017)
  Yeray Lamariano (2021-)
  Abel Serdio (2016-2019)
  Jorge Serrano (2016-2022)
  Guillermo Fischer (2021-2022)
  Gastón Mouriño (2018)
  Arthur Patrianova (2019-2022)
  José Toledo (2022-)
  Nicolo D'Antino (2022-)
  Darko Dimitrievski (2022-)
  Dimitar Dimitrioski (2022-)

Former coaches

References

External links
 
 

Spanish handball clubs
Liga ASOBAL teams
Sport in Valladolid